Troidini is a tribe of swallowtail butterflies that consists of some 135 species in 12 genera. Members of this tribe are superlatively large among butterflies (in terms of both wingspan and surface area) and are often strikingly coloured.

Genera
The tribe consists of the following genera:

 Atrophaneura
 Battus
 Byasa
 Cressida
 Euryades
 Losaria
 Ornithoptera
 Pachliopta
 Parides
 Pharmacophagus
 Trogonoptera
 Troides

Ecology
Members of this tribe feed on poisonous pipevine plants, typically of the genus Aristolochia, as larvae. As a result, they themselves are poisonous and unpalatable to predators (Pinheiro 1986), like the pipevine swallowtail, and are mimicked by other butterflies (Scott 1986).

Examples of butterflies in Troidini

Citations
 Pinheiro, Carlos E. G. (1996): Palatability and escaping ability in Neotropical butterflies: tests with wild kingbirds (Tyrannus melancholicus, Tyrannidae). Biological Journal of the Linnean Society 59(4): 351–365. HTML abstract
 Scott, James A. (1986): The Butterflies of North America. Stanford University Press.

References

Papilionidae
Butterfly tribes
Taxa named by George Talbot (entomologist)